Jahanara Begum ( – 24 July 2021) was a Bangladeshi politician, a Jatiya Sangsad member representing the Rajbari-1 constituency and a State Minister of Cultural Affairs.

Career 
Begum served twice as the Minister of State for Culture and Adviser to the then Prime Minister Khaleda Zia on Primary Education and Mass Education.

Begum was a member of the women's seat-22 in the 5th Jatiya Sangsad. She was elected a Member of Parliament from Rajbari-1 (Sadar-Goaland) constituency on 15 February 1996 in the Sixth Parliamentary Election on the nomination of Bangladesh Nationalist Party. She was the vice chairman of BNP.

Begum was the co-chairman of the Bangladesh Nationalist Front (BNF). She previously served as Secretary General of the Liberal Democratic Party (LDP).

References

1942 births
2021 deaths
People from Rajbari District
6th Jatiya Sangsad members
5th Jatiya Sangsad members
Women members of the Jatiya Sangsad
Women government ministers of Bangladesh
State Ministers of Cultural Affairs (Bangladesh)